Chief Ezekiel Tenywa Wako was the first Kyabazinga of Busoga and ascended to the throne on February 11, 1939.

References 

Ugandan monarchies
Year of birth missing
Year of death missing
Ugandan chiefs